Ignacio 'Natxo' Insa Bohigues (born 9 June 1986) is a professional footballer who plays as a midfielder for Malaysian club Johor Darul Ta'zim.

He spent most of his career in Segunda División, playing 244 matches and scoring and a total of ten goals for Eibar, Villarreal B, Celta, Zaragoza, Alcorcón and Levante. In La Liga, he represented Villarreal's first team and Celta.

Spanish-born, Insa appeared for Malaysia internationally, making his debut in 2018.

Club career
Insa was born in Cocentaina, Province of Alicante, Valencian Community. A product of Valencia CF's youth ranks, he made his first-team debut in a friendly with Fenerbahçe S.K. in July 2006, but spent the vast majority of that season with the B side in the Segunda División B. He first appeared officially for the main squad on 5 December 2006, coming on as an early substitute in a UEFA Champions League game at A.S. Roma (1–0 group stage loss). He played his first La Liga match on 17 June of the following year, featuring the last six minutes of the 3–3 home draw against Real Sociedad.

Insa was loaned to Segunda División club SD Eibar in 2007–08, scoring twice in 33 appearances. The deal was renewed for the following campaign, where he appeared slightly less and also suffered relegation.

In August 2009, Insa moved to Villarreal CF, spending his first season with the reserves also in the second level. He played just one competitive match with the first team, 11 minutes in a 1–0 away defeat to CA Osasuna.

From 2011 to 2013, Insa represented RC Celta de Vigo. In the latter campaign he scored two goals, the first in a 2–2 home draw against FC Barcelona and the second in a 1–0 victory over RCD Espanyol also at Balaídos; that last matchday win ultimately proved essential, as the Galicians eventually avoided relegation.

After a one-year spell abroad at Turkey's Antalyaspor, Insa returned to Spain and its second tier in January 2015, appearing for Real Zaragoza, AD Alcorcón and Levante UD in quick succession. On 6 June 2017, he signed with Malaysia Super League's Johor Darul Ta'zim F.C. for a fee of nearly €400,000.

International career
Insa obtained Malaysian citizenship through his grandmother, who was born in Sabah. He won his first cap for their national team on 22 March 2018 at the age of 31, in a 2–2 friendly draw with Mongolia.

Personal life
Insa's younger brother, Kiko, is also a former Malaysian international footballer.

Career statistics

Club

International

Honours
Levante
Segunda División: 2016–17

Johor Darul Ta'zim
Malaysia Super League: 2017, 2018, 2019, 2020, 2021, 2022
Malaysia Cup: 2017, 2019, 2022
Malaysia Charity Shield: 2018, 2019, 2020, 2021
Malaysia FA Cup: 2022

Individual
Malaysia Super League Player of the Month: October 2017

References

External links

1986 births
Living people
People from Cocentaina
Spanish people of Malaysian descent
Malaysian people of Spanish descent
Citizens of Malaysia through descent
Spanish emigrants to Malaysia
Sportspeople from the Province of Alicante
Spanish footballers
Malaysian footballers
Footballers from the Valencian Community
Association football midfielders
La Liga players
Segunda División players
Segunda División B players
Valencia CF Mestalla footballers
Valencia CF players
SD Eibar footballers
Villarreal CF B players
Villarreal CF players
RC Celta de Vigo players
Real Zaragoza players
AD Alcorcón footballers
Levante UD footballers
Süper Lig players
Antalyaspor footballers
Malaysia Super League players
Johor Darul Ta'zim F.C. players
Malaysia international footballers
Spanish expatriate footballers
Expatriate footballers in Turkey
Expatriate footballers in Malaysia
Spanish expatriate sportspeople in Turkey